Emily Frances Valentine, designated the first lady of rugby and "female William Web Ellis" by the media, is the earliest documented female rugby player (at the age of 10) in 1887, and provides the only confirmed record of a woman playing in the nineteenth century. Prior to the discovery of Valentine, the earliest named female rugby player was Mary Eley in 1917, who at the age of sixteen played for the Cardiff Ladies.

Rugby
Valentine, born in County Fermanagh, Northern Ireland circa 1878, was the youngest of six brothers and sisters. She played her first match of rugby union at the Portora Royal School, three years after her father William Valentine was named Assistant Headmaster. According to her memoirs, in the winter of 1887, she removed her hat and overcoat to play alongside her two brothers (William, aged 16, and John, aged 10 or 11) as their team was a man short. Valentine first  kicked place, but then scored a try in her first game after moving to the wing alongside her brothers in the backline. Valentine would continue to participate with the team in practices and intra-school matches according to the school's records which also includes correspondence from Valentine in 1951.

Personal life
Valentine moved to South Africa in the late 19th century. She became a nurse and changed her name to Galway after marrying military doctor Major John Galeway OBE in 1909. Valentine moved to India until about 1915 (and possibly Canada) before settling in England.

One of Valentine's eight grandchildren is named Catherine Galway.

References

1870s births
1967 deaths
19th-century Irish women
People educated at Portora Royal School
Irish female rugby union players
British women nurses
Irish expatriate sportspeople in England